Ademiluyi Ajagun was the 48th Ooni of Ife, a paramount traditional king of Ile-Ife, the ancestral home of the Yorubas. He was one of the most feared kings and was highly respected in Africa and around the world. He succeeded Ooni Adekola and was succeeded by Ooni Adesoji Aderemi.

Early life
Adémilúyì, meaning "my crown is honorable," was born around the year 1860 to the Royal House of Lafogido, one of the 4 houses of the Ọ̀rànmíyàn dynasty, descended from Oduduwa and Oranmiyan. He was also a descendant of the 31st Ọọni of Ìfẹ̀, Otutubíọ̀ṣun. He was born to Prince Adémákin and one of his wives, Òbítọ́lá. He was the second child of his parents, his siblings were Adésanyà, Jọláadépọ̀ (the only daughter), Adébọwálé, and Adéyẹyè.

Reign

Ooni Adémilúyì was a feared warrior, hunter and a skilled farmer. He routinely went on dangerous expeditions in Èkìtì country where he killed many animals such as lions, leopards, elephants, and antelope. Due to his fearlessness and many other outstanding qualities, he eventually became the 48th Ọọni of Ìfẹ̀. In order to establish Ìfẹ̀'s dominance as the ancient capital of the Yoruba people, Adémilúyì pursued a close relationship with British rule under George V. He became the Head of Native Administration in 1912, while in 1916 the Native Court Ordinance made him the President. During his reign, he also welcomed German explorer Leo Frobenius to Ìfẹ̀ where he did archaeological research. However sculptures from Ìfẹ̀ was stolen during this time, as it is highlighted by Wole Soyinka in his 1986 Nobel Lecture. While Ooni Adémilúyì was a devout worshipper of the Yoruba religion, he supported the expansion of religious institutions throughout Ìfẹ̀. There were legendary beliefs that Ooni Adémilúyì was fond of using mystical powers, changing and transforming into wild animals, usually to a leopard-ambushing and killing his opponents. In fact, it was established that whenever the natives caught the glimpse or saw a wild animal crossing, they normally concluded that Ooni Adémilúyì was passing by on a vicious mission.

Death and legacy

The king (Ọba) died on June 24, 1930, at about the age of 70. He was succeeded by Adesoji Aderemi. Ọba Ademiluyi had over 47 wives and is said to have had a range of 70 to over 100 children. One of his male children was Prince Okero Ademiluyi, and one of his female children was Princess Adeyefa Adémilúyì from one of his wives Dekunbi. Ọba Ademiluyi also has a great-grandson Ifedayo-Emmanuel Adeyefa-Olasupo, a British-born Yoruba scientist at the Howard Hughes Medical Institute. In popular culture, the painting called the "African Mona Lisa," is said to depict a granddaughter of Ọba Ademiluyi.

References

Oonis of Ife
Yoruba history